Gorriti is a town in Larraun, Navarre, Spain. It may also refer to:

People
Raúl Gorriti (1956–2015), Peruvian professional football midfielder
José Ignacio de Gorriti (1770–1835), Argentine statesman, soldier and lawyer
Gustavo Gorriti (born in 1948), Peruvian journalist
Juana Manuela Gorriti (1818–1892), Argentine writer

Places
Gorriti Island, a small island near the shores of Punta del Este, Uruguay.